Priest Lake State Park is a public recreation area in Bonner County, Idaho, United States. It consists of three units near the southern, eastern and northern shores of Priest Lake: Dickenseet, Indian Creek, and Lionhead.

See also

 List of Idaho state parks
 National Parks in Idaho

References

External links

Priest Lake State Park Idaho Parks and Recreation

State parks of Idaho
Protected areas established in 1973
Protected areas of Bonner County, Idaho